Leucine rich repeat containing 26 (LRRC26) is a protein that in humans is encoded by the LRRC26 gene.

References

Further reading